20th Kushok Bakula Rinpoche, Thubstan Nawang or Stanzin Nawang Jigmed Wangchuk, (born 23 January 2005) was born to Yab Dorjey Tsering and Yum Sonam Dolkar in Kyagar village in Nubra valley in Ladakh and has been introduced to the monastic life in Samstanling Gonpa before enthroned on 12 August 2010 in Pethup Gonpa in Spituk. He is believed to be the 20th incarnation of Kushok Bakula Rinpoche.

References 

Rinpoches
Living people
2005 births